The Waitresses were an American new wave band from Akron, Ohio, best known for their singles "I Know What Boys Like" and "Christmas Wrapping." They released two albums, Wasn't Tomorrow Wonderful? and Bruiseology, and two EPs, I Could Rule the World If I Could Only Get the Parts and Make the Weather.

The group was led by guitarist-songwriter Chris Butler with lead vocals performed by Patty Donahue.

History
The Waitresses were formed by Butler (formerly of the Numbers Band) in 1978 as a side project while he was still a member of Tin Huey. He wrote and recorded "I Know What Boys Like" that year, with guest vocals by friend Donahue (as "Patty Darling") and saxophone from Tin Huey member Ralph Carney, although the song remained unreleased at the time. A debut single, In "Short Stack" (featuring the songs "Slide" and "Clones"), recorded solely by Butler, was issued by Clone Records in 1978. Both tracks from the single, plus another early song, "The Comb," appeared that year on The Akron Compilation, issued by Stiff Records.

Butler moved to New York City and shopped "I Know What Boys Like." The song landed him a deal with ZE Records (an affiliate of Antilles Records), who released the single in 1980. It was an underground hit, but did not chart.

With the deal in place, Butler put together an actual band lineup for the Waitresses, featuring lead vocalist Donahue, jazz saxophonist Mars Williams, former Television drummer Billy Ficca, keyboardist Dan Klayman, bassist Dave Hofstra and backing vocalist Ariel Warner. The Waitresses played their debut concert on New Year's Eve 1980.

The Waitresses released their debut album, Wasn't Tomorrow Wonderful? on January 11, 1982, on the Polydor label, licensed from ZE. "I Know What Boys Like" was included on the album and when the song was re-released as a single in 1982, it peaked at No. 62 on the Billboard Hot 100,
No. 23 on Billboard'''s Top Tracks chart,
No. 14 on the Australian Singles Chart (Kent Music Report),
and also charted in the UK.

During the recording sessions for the album, which peaked at No. 41 in the Billboard 200 chart, Warner resigned from the band due to stage fright and Hofstra quit before its release to be replaced by Tracy Wormworth.

A Christmas song by the band, "Christmas Wrapping," had originally been released on the ZE Records album A Christmas Record in 1981 and became a No. 45 hit in the United Kingdom in 1982.
The song was subsequently covered by the Spice Girls in 1998, as the B-side of their single "Goodbye"
and on the television show Glee sung by the character Brittany for their 2011 Christmas special.

The Waitresses recorded the theme song to the television program Square Pegs,
starring Sarah Jessica Parker and Amy Linker, which aired during the 1982–1983 season, and the band appeared as themselves in the pilot episode. The song was issued by Polydor as a single in 1982, and was included (along with "Christmas Wrapping") on the EP I Could Rule the World If I Could Only Get the Parts that same year.

The band's second album, Bruiseology, was released by Polydor in May 1983 followed by the Make the Weather EP in 1984.

In the summer of 1984, Donahue left the band and was replaced by Holly Beth Vincent, formerly of Holly and the Italians, but Vincent herself left after just two weeks and Donahue returned. The Waitresses split up in December 1984.

Post-breakup
Donahue died of lung cancer at the age of 40 on December 9, 1996.

Butler later worked as a producer, and played with numerous bands and artists including Half Cleveland, Purple K'nif and Richard Lloyd.

Ficca played in Gods and Monsters and returned to his former group Television when they reunited in 1991. Williams played with the Psychedelic Furs, NRG Ensemble, Liquid Soul, Hal Russell and Ken Vandermark. Wormworth has played bass for the B-52's since 1992.King Biscuit Flower Hour Presents the Waitresses, a live album recorded in 1982 at My Father's Place in Roslyn, New York, was issued in 1997 by King Biscuit Flower Hour.

Polydor issued two compilation albums, The Best of the Waitresses (1990) and 20th Century Masters – The Millennium Collection: The Best of The Waitresses (2003).

In 2013, Omnivore Recordings released the compilation Just Desserts: The Complete Waitresses, collecting virtually all of the band's recordings for Polydor, while ZE Records issued a digital collection of their ZE releases, Deluxe Special: Ze Complete Recordings''.

Personnel
 Chris Butler – guitar, backing vocals (1978–1984)
 Patty Donahue – lead vocals (1980–1983, 1984, died 1996)
 David Hofstra – bass guitar (1980–1982)
 Billy Ficca – drums (1980–1984)
 Dan Klayman – keyboards, organ (1980–1984)
 Ariel Warner – backing vocals (1980–1982)
 Mars Williams – saxophone, reed instruments (1980–1984)
 Tracy Wormworth – bass guitar, backing vocals (1982–1984)
 Holly Beth Vincent – lead vocals (1983–1984)

Discography

Studio albums

EPs

Singles

Live albums

Compilation albums

References

Further reading

External links 
 Unofficial Biography of The Waitresses
 The Waitresses at Trouser Press
 How They Made Their Mark in History

 
American new wave musical groups
American post-punk music groups
Musical groups from Akron, Ohio
Musical groups from Kent, Ohio
Polydor Records artists
ZE Records artists
Omnivore Recordings artists
Musical groups established in 1977
Musical groups disestablished in 1984
1977 establishments in Ohio
1984 disestablishments in Ohio
Musical groups from Ohio
Female-fronted musical groups